Waldo School District was a school district headquartered in Waldo, Arkansas. It operated Waldo Elementary School (K-6) and Waldo High School (7-12). The bulldog was the mascot.

On July 1, 2006, it consolidated with the Magnolia School District. The Magnolia district administration did not wish to absorb the Waldo district, but the Arkansas Board of Education forced the merger with a unanimous vote.

References

Further reading
 - Includes a map of the district even though, by 2010, it had already consolidated into the Magnolia district
 (Download) - Map of the district

External links
 
 

Education in Columbia County, Arkansas
Defunct school districts in Arkansas
2006 disestablishments in Arkansas
School districts disestablished in 2006